The men's 25 metre center-fire pistol team competition at the 2010 Asian Games in Guangzhou, China was held on 18 November at the Aoti Shooting Range.

Schedule
All times are China Standard Time (UTC+08:00)

Records

Results

References

ISSF Results Overview

External links
Official website

Men Pistol 25 C T